Gaius Valerius Catullus (84 -  54 BCE), often referred to simply as Catullus, was a Latin poet of the late Roman Republic who wrote chiefly in the neoteric style of poetry, focusing on personal life rather than classical heroes. His surviving works are still read widely and continue to influence poetry and other forms of art.

Catullus's poems were widely appreciated by contemporary poets, significantly influencing Ovid and Virgil, among others. After his rediscovery in the Late Middle Ages, Catullus again found admirers such as Petrarch. The explicit sexual imagery which he uses in some of his poems has shocked many readers. Yet, at many instruction levels, Catullus is considered a resource for teachers of Latin.

Catullus's style is highly personal, humorous, and emotional; he frequently uses hyperbole, anaphora, alliteration, and diminutives. In 25 of his poems, he mentions his devotion to a woman he refers to as "Lesbia", who is widely believed to have been the Roman aristocrat Clodia Metelli. One of the most famous of his poems is his 5th, which is often recognized for its passionate language and opening line: "" ("Let us live, my Lesbia, and let us love").

Life
Gāius Valerius Catullus was born to a leading equestrian family of Verona, in Cisalpine Gaul. The social prominence of the Catullus family allowed the father of Gaius Valerius to entertain Julius Caesar when he was the Promagistrate (proconsul) of both Gallic provinces. In a poem, Catullus describes his happy homecoming to the family villa at Sirmio, on Lake Garda, near Verona; he also owned a villa near the resort of Tibur (modern Tivoli).

Catullus appears to have spent most of his young adult years in Rome. His friends there included the poets Licinius Calvus, and Helvius Cinna, Quintus Hortensius (son of the orator and rival of Cicero) and the biographer Cornelius Nepos, to whom Catullus dedicated a libellus of poems, the relation of which to the extant collection remains a matter of debate. He appears to have been acquainted with the poet Marcus Furius Bibaculus. A number of prominent contemporaries appear in his poetry, including Cicero, Caesar and Pompey. According to an anecdote preserved by Suetonius, Caesar did not deny that Catullus's lampoons left an indelible stain on his reputation, but when Catullus apologized, he invited the poet for dinner the very same day.

It was probably in Rome that Catullus fell deeply in love with the "Lesbia" of his poems, who is usually identified with Clodia Metelli, a sophisticated woman from the aristocratic house of patrician family Claudii Pulchri, sister of the infamous Publius Clodius Pulcher, and wife to proconsul Quintus Caecilius Metellus Celer. In his poems Catullus describes several stages of their relationship: initial euphoria, doubts, separation, and his wrenching feelings of loss. Clodia had several other partners; "From the poems one can adduce no fewer than five lovers in addition to Catullus: Egnatius (poem 37), Gellius (poem 91), Quintius (poem 82), Rufus (poem 77), and Lesbius (poem 79)." There is also some question surrounding her husband's mysterious death in 59 BCE, with some critics believing he was domestically poisoned. However, a sensitive and passionate Catullus could not relinquish his flame for Clodia, regardless of her obvious indifference to his desire for a deep and permanent relationship. In his poems, Catullus wavers between devout, sweltering love and bitter, scornful insults that he directs at her blatant infidelity (as demonstrated in poems 11 and 58). His passion for her is unrelenting—yet it is unclear when exactly the couple split up for good. Catullus's poems about the relationship display striking depth and psychological insight.

He spent the provincial command year summer 57 to summer 56 BCE in Bithynia on the staff of the commander Gaius Memmius. While in the East, he traveled to the Troad to perform rites at his brother's tomb, an event recorded in a moving poem.

No ancient biography of Catullus has survived: his life has to be pieced together from scattered references to him in other ancient authors and from his poems. Thus it is uncertain when he was born and when he died. St. Jerome says that he died in his 30th year, and was born in 87 BCE. But the poems include references to events of 55 and 54 BCE. Since the Roman consular fasti make it somewhat easy to confuse 87–57 BCE with 84–54 BCE, many scholars accept the dates 84 BC–54 BCE, supposing that his latest poems and the publication of his libellus coincided with the year of his death. Other authors suggest 52 or 51 BCE as the year of the poet's death. Though upon his elder brother's death Catullus lamented that their "whole house was buried along" with the deceased, the existence (and prominence) of Valerii Catulli is attested in the following centuries. T.P. Wiseman argues that after the brother's death Catullus could have married, and that, in this case, the later Valerii Catulli may have been his descendants.

Poetry

Sources and organization
Catullus's poems have been preserved in an anthology of 116 carmina (the actual number of poems may slightly vary in various editions), which can be divided into three parts according to their form: sixty short poems in varying meters, called polymetra, eight longer poems, and forty-eight epigrams.

There is no scholarly consensus on whether Catullus himself arranged the order of the poems. The longer poems differ from the polymetra and the epigrams not only in length but also in their subjects: There are seven hymns and one mini-epic, or epyllion, the most highly prized form for the "new poets".

The polymetra and the epigrams can be divided into four major thematic groups (ignoring a rather large number of poems that elude such categorization):

 poems to and about his friends (e.g., an invitation like poem 13).
 erotic poems: some of them (eg. (50, 9, 99) etc. are about his attraction toward other men, but others are about women, especially about one he calls "Lesbia" (which served as a false name for his married girlfriend, Clodia, source and inspiration of many of his poems). In modern terms, he would likely be called bisexual, though the Romans had no labels such as this.
 invectives: often rude and sometimes downright obscene poems targeted at friends-turned-traitors (e.g., poem 16), other lovers of Lesbia, well-known poets, politicians (e.g., Julius Caesar) and rhetors, including Cicero.
 condolences: some poems of Catullus are solemn in nature. 96 comforts a friend in the death of a loved one; several others, most famously 101, lament the death of his brother.

All these poems describe the lifestyle of Catullus and his friends, who, despite Catullus's temporary political post in Bithynia, lived their lives withdrawn from politics. They were interested mainly in poetry and love. Above all other qualities, Catullus seems to have valued venustas, or charm, in his acquaintances, a theme which he explores in a number of his poems. The ancient Roman concept of virtus (i.e., of virtue that had to be proved by a political or military career), which Cicero suggested as the solution to the societal problems of the late Republic, meant little to them.

However Catullus does not reject traditional notions, but rather their particular application to the vita activa of politics and war. Indeed, he tries to reinvent these notions from a personal point of view and to introduce them into human relationships. For example, he applies the word fides, which traditionally meant faithfulness towards one's political allies, to his relationship with Lesbia and reinterprets it as unconditional faithfulness in love. So, despite the seeming frivolity of his lifestyle, Catullus measured himself and his friends by quite ambitious standards.

Intellectual influences

Catullus's poetry was influenced by the innovative poetry of the Hellenistic Age, and especially by Callimachus and the Alexandrian school, which had propagated a new style of poetry that deliberately turned away from the classical epic poetry in the tradition of Homer. Cicero called these local innovators neoteroi or "moderns" (in Latin poetae novi or 'new poets'), in that they cast off the heroic model handed down from Ennius in order to strike new ground and ring a contemporary note. Catullus and Callimachus did not describe the feats of ancient heroes and gods (except perhaps in re-evaluating and predominantly artistic circumstances, e.g. poems 63 and 64), focusing instead on small-scale personal themes. Although these poems sometimes seem quite superficial and their subjects often are mere everyday concerns, they are accomplished works of art. Catullus described his work as expolitum, or polished, to show that the language he used was very carefully and artistically composed.

Catullus was also an admirer of Sappho, a female poet of the seventh century BCE. Catullus 51 partly translates, partly imitates, and transforms Sappho 31.  Some hypothesize that 61 and 62 were perhaps inspired by lost works of Sappho but this is purely speculative. Both of the latter are epithalamia, a form of laudatory or erotic wedding-poetry that Sappho was famous for. Catullus twice used a meter that Sappho was known for, called the Sapphic stanza, in poems 11 and 51, perhaps prompting his successor Horace's interest in the form.

Catullus, as was common to his era, was greatly influenced by stories from Greek and Roman myth. His longer poems—such as 63, 64, 65, 66, and 68—allude to mythology in various ways. Some stories he refers to are the wedding of Peleus and Thetis, the departure of the Argonauts, Theseus and the Minotaur, Ariadne's abandonment, Tereus and Procne, as well as Protesilaus and Laodamia.

Style
Catullus wrote in many different meters including hendecasyllabic verse and elegiac couplets (common in love poetry). A great part of his poetry shows strong and occasionally wild emotions, especially in regard to Lesbia (e.g., poems 5 and 7). His love poems are very emotional and ardent, and are relatable to this day. Catullus describes his Lesbia as having multiple suitors and often showing little affection towards him. He also demonstrates a great sense of humour such as in Catullus 13.

Musical settings
Catullus Dreams (2011) is a song cycle by David Glaser set to texts of Catullus. The cycle is scored for soprano and seven instruments. It was premiered at Symphony Space in New York by soprano Linda Larson and Sequitur Ensemble.

Catulli Carmina is a cantata by Carl Orff set to the texts of Catullus.

"Carmina Catulli" is a song cycle arranged from 17 of Catullus's poems by American composer Michael Linton. The cycle was recorded in December 2013 and premiered at Carnegie Hall's Weill Recital Hall in March 2014 by French baritone Edwin Crossley-Mercer and pianist Jason Paul Peterson.

Dutch composer Bertha Tideman-Wijers used Catullus's text for her composition Variations on Valerius "Where that one already turns or turns."

Catullus 5, the love poem "Vivamus mea Lesbia atque amemus", in the translation by Ben Jonson, was set to music (lute accompanied song) by Alfonso Ferrabosco the younger. Thomas Campion also wrote a lute-song using his own translation of the first six lines of Catullus 5 followed by two verses of his own. The translation by Richard Crashaw was set to music in a four-part glee by Samuel Webbe Jr. It was also set to music in a three-part glee by John Stafford Smith.
The Hungarian born British composer Matyas Seiber set poem 31 for unaccompanied mixed chorus Sirmio in 1957.
Finnish jazz singer Reine Rimón has recorded poems of Catullus set to standard jazz tunes.

The American composer Ned Rorem set Catullus 101 to music for voice and piano. The song, "Catallus: on the Burial of His Brother", was originally published in 1969.

The Icelandic composer Jóhann Jóhannsson set Catullus 85 to music. The poem is sung through a vocoder. The music is played by a string quartet and piano. Titled "Odi Et Amo", the song is found on Jóhannsson's album Englabörn.

Cultural depictions
 The 1888 play Lesbia by Richard Davey depicts the relationship between Catullus and Lesbia, based on incidents from his poems.
 Catullus was the main protagonist of the historical novel Farewell, Catullus (1953) by Pierson Dixon. The novel shows the corruption of Roman society.
W. G. Hardy's novel The City of Libertines (1957) tells the fictionalized story of Catullus and a love affair during the time of Julius Caesar. The Financial Post described the book as "an authentic story of an absorbing era".
 A poem by Catullus is being recited to Cleopatra in the eponymous 1963 film when Julius Caesar comes to visit her; they talk about him (Cleopatra: 'Catullus doesn't approve of you. Why haven't you had him killed?' Caesar: 'Because I approve of him.') and Caesar then recites other poems by him.
The American poet Louis Zukofsky in 1969 wrote a set of homophonic translations of Catullus that attempted in English to replicate the sound as primary emphasis, rather than the more common emphasis on sense of the originals (although the relationship between sound and sense there is often misrepresented and has been clarified by careful study); his Catullus versions have had extensive influence on contemporary innovative poetry and homophonic translation, including the work of poets Robert Duncan, Robert Kelly, and Charles Bernstein.
Catullus is the protagonist of Tom Holland's 1995 novel Attis.
Catullus appears in Steven Saylor's novel The Venus Throw as the embittered ex lover of Clodia, sister of Publius Clodius Pulcher, whom he calls Lesbia.

See also
Codex Vaticanus Ottobonianus Latinus 1829
Poetry of Catullus
Prosody (Latin)

References

Further reading

 Calinski, T. (2021). . Darmstadt: WBG Academic
 Claes, P. (2002). Concatenatio Catulliana, A New Reading of the Carmina. Amsterdam: J.C. Gieben 

 

 
 
 

 
 

 

 
 Hild, Christian (2013). . St. Ingbert:      Röhrig. .
 
Kaggelaris, N. (2015), "Wedding Cry: Sappho (Fr. 109 LP, Fr. 104(a) LP)- Catullus (c. 62. 20-5)- modern greek folk songs" [in Greek] in Avdikos, E.- Koziou-Kolofotia, B. (ed.) Modern Greek folk songs and history, Karditsa, pp. 260–70 

 
 
 

 

 

 Radici Colace, P., 1985, pp. 53–71.
 Radici Colace, P., 1987, 39-57.
 Radici Colace, P., Reggio Calabria 1989, 137-142.
 Radici Colace, P., in AA.VV., Pisa 1992,  1-13.
 Radici Colace, P., Messana n.s.15, 1993,  23-44.
 Radici Colace, P., (Napoli 9 maggio 1995) ―A.I.O.N.‖ XVIII, 1996,  155-167.
 Radici Colace, P., in ―Paideia‖ LXIV, 2009, 553-561

External links

 Works by Catullus at Perseus Digital Library
 
 
 
 Catullus translations: Catullus's work in Latin and multiple (ten or more) modern languages, including scanned versions of every poem
 Catullus in Latin and English
 Catullus translated exclusively in English Translated by A. S. Kline
 Catullus Online: searchable Latin text, repertory of conjectures, and images of the most important manuscripts
 Catullus: Latin text, concordances and frequency list
 Catullus purified: a brief history of Carmen 16 by Thomas Nelson Winter
 SORGLL:  Catullus 5, read by Robert Sonkowsky

 
1st-century BC Romans
1st-century BC Roman poets
Elegiac poets
Golden Age Latin writers
Iambic poets
80s BC births
54 BC deaths
Writers from Verona
Bisexual poets
Italian LGBT poets
LGBT history in Italy
Valerii
Ancient LGBT people